Mahathala is a small genus of hairstreak butterflies in the family Lycaenidae. Two species occur in Southeast Asia, the third is endemic to Mongolia.

Species
Mahathala ameria (Hewitson, 1862)
Mahathala ariadeva Fruhstorfer, 1908 Burma, Thailand, Peninsular Malaya, Sumatra
Mahathala gone Druce, 1895 Mongolia

References
"Mahathala Moore, 1878" at Markku Savela's Lepidoptera and Some Other Life Forms

 
Arhopalini
Lycaenidae genera
Taxa named by Frederic Moore